German submarine U-705 was a Type VIIC U-boat of Nazi Germany's Kriegsmarine during World War II.

Commissioned on 30 December 1941, she served with the 5th U-boat Flotilla until 31 July 1942 as a training boat, and as a front boat of 6th U-boat Flotilla under the command of Oberleutnant zur See Karl-Horst Horn, until her sinking on 3 September 1942.

Design
German Type VIIC submarines were preceded by the shorter Type VIIB submarines. U-705 had a displacement of  when at the surface and  while submerged. She had two shafts and two  propellers.

U-705 was fitted with five  torpedo tubes (four fitted at the bow and one at the stern), fourteen torpedoes, one  SK C/35 naval gun, 220 rounds, and a  C/30 anti-aircraft gun. The boat had a complement of between forty-four and sixty.

Service history
Departing on her first and only patrol on 1 August 1942, U-705 left Kiel to encircle the British Isles and turn back after crossing more than half of the Atlantic.

Diving after first being seen, she stayed submerged for nearly four hours before firing a torpedo at the starboard side of the Balladier. Listing to the starboard side, the armed guards were unable to return fire on U-705, with the ship sinking after seven minutes.

Dropping five depth charges from the Viscount, along with a further ten from the Potentilla, the two were unable to cause damage to the boat.

Fate
On 3 September 1942, Armstrong Whitworth Whitleys of No. 77 Squadron RAF dropped depth charges at U-705, causing her to sink with all hands lost in the Bay of Biscay.

Wolfpacks
U-705 took part in one wolfpack, namely:
 Lohs (11 – 26 August 1942)

Summary of raiding history

References

Bibliography

External links

German Type VIIC submarines
U-boats commissioned in 1941
1941 ships
U-boats sunk in 1942
World War II submarines of Germany
Ships built in Hamburg
U-boats sunk by British aircraft
U-boats sunk by depth charges
World War II shipwrecks in the Atlantic Ocean
Shipwrecks in the Bay of Biscay
Ships lost with all hands
Maritime incidents in September 1942